The 2020 FC Kairat season is the 10th successive season that the club will play in the Kazakhstan Premier League, the highest tier of association football in Kazakhstan, since their promotion back to the top flight in 2009. Kairat will also play in the Kazakhstan Cup and the Europa League.

Season events
On 11 January, Kairat announced the signing of Kamo Hovhannisyan to a two-year contract.
On 19 January, Kairat announced the signing of Jacek Góralski to a three-year contract.
On 27 January, Kairat announced the signing of Gulzhigit Alykulov on a two-year contract, with the option of a third, and the signing of Abat Aimbetov to a one-year contract, with the option of a second.

On 3 February, Danil Ustimenko extended his contract with Kairat until the end of the 2024 season, Adam Adakhadzhiev and Vyacheslav Shvyrev extended their contracts until the end of the 2023 season and Artur Shushenachev extended his contract until the end of the 2022 season.

On 13 March, the Football Federation of Kazakhstan announced all league fixtures would be played behind closed doors for the foreseeable future due to the COVID-19 pandemic. On 16 March the Football Federation of Kazakhstan suspended all football until 15 April.

On 26 March, Kairat announced the signing of Kirill Kolesnichenko to a three-year contract from Chertanovo Moscow.

After Ramazan Orazov left the club in March to join BFC Daugavpils, whilst still having a valid contract with Kairat, Kairat filled a grievance lawsuit with FIFA against the Latvian club, seeking compensation.

On 26 July, it was announced that the league would resume on 1 July, with no fans being permitted to watch the games. On 3 July, the Kazakhstan Premier League was suspended for two-weeks due to the COVID-19 pandemic.

On 8 July, Kairat announced the signing of Brazilian international Vágner Love on a six-month contract, with the option to extend it.

On 24 August, Kairat announced the signing of Dzyanis Palyakow to an 18-month contract after his release by Ural Yekaterinburg.

On 3 September, Kirill Kolesnichenko joined Rotor Volgograd.

On 5 November, Kairat extended their contract with Vágner Love until the end of the 2021 season, with Rade Dugalić extending his contract until the end of the 2022 season on 6 November, and Dino Mikanović also extending his contract for two year on 7 November.

On 20 November, Nebojša Kosović extended his contract with Kairat for an additional two-years, with the club confirming that Nuraly Alip is under contract with Kairat until the 2023 the following day.

On 2 December, Nurlan Dairov and Konrad Wrzesiński left the club after their contracts had expired.

Squad

Out on loan

Transfers

In

Out

Loans out

Released

Friendlies

Competitions

Premier League

Results summary

Results by round

Results

League table

Kazakhstan Cup

UEFA Europa League

Qualifying rounds

Squad statistics

Appearances and goals

|-
|colspan="14"|Players away from Kairat on loan:
|-
|colspan="14"|Players who left Kairat during the season:
|}

Goal scorers

Clean sheet

Disciplinary record

References

External links
Official Website

FC Kairat seasons
Kairat
Kairat